
Year 422 BC was a year of the pre-Julian Roman calendar. At the time, it was known as the Year of the Tribunate of Capitolinus, Mugillanus and Merenda (or, less frequently, year 332 Ab urbe condita). The denomination 422 BC for this year has been used since the early medieval period, when the Anno Domini calendar era became the prevalent method in Europe for naming years.

Events 
 By place 
 Greece 
 Athenian leader, Cleon, ends the truce between Athens and Sparta after he resolves to rescue the town of Amphipolis in Macedonia. However, through skillful generalship by Brasidas, the Spartans rout the Athenians in the Battle of Amphipolis. Both Brasidas and Cleon are killed in the battle, thereby removing the key members of the pro-war factions on both sides.
 Alcibiades takes over the leadership of the pro-war party in Athens.

 By topic 
 Drama 
 Aristophanes' play The Wasps is performed.

Births

Deaths 
 Brasidas, Spartan general
 Cleon, Athenian politician

References